V. M. Ezhumalai was an Indian actor and comedian who featured in Tamil language films. He was active in the field from 1937 till 1962. He had a style of his own making viewers to laugh by his body language as well as by voice. He started his career on stage and then switched to films. During the early days he was employed on a monthly salary at Modern Theatres, Salem along with other comedians like Kali N. Rathnam and A. Karunanidhi.

Filmography

References

External links
 
 
  - Film Mangalyam sung by T. M. Soundararajan and K. R. Sellamuthu (for Ezhumalai)

Indian male film actors
Male actors in Tamil cinema
Tamil comedians
Indian male comedians